Cidade Universitária station is part of the Yellow Line of the Lisbon Metro.

History
The station opened on October 14, 1988. It is located on Avenida Professor Gama Pinto. It serves the main campus of the University of Lisbon, hence its name.

The architectural design of the original station is by Sanchez.

Connections

Urban buses

Carris 
 731 Av. José Malhoa ⇄ Moscavide Centro
 735 Cais do Sodré ⇄ Hospital Santa Maria
 738 Quinta dos Barros ⇄ Alto de Santo Amaro
 755 Poço do Bispo ⇄ Sete Rios
 764 Cidade Universitária ⇄ Damaia de Cima
 768 Cidade Universitária ⇄ Quinta dos Alcoutins

Transportes Sul do Tejo 
 176 Almada (Praça S. J. Batista) ⇄ Lisboa (Cidade Universitária) (via Alcântara)

See also
 List of Lisbon metro stations

References

External links

Yellow Line (Lisbon Metro) stations
Railway stations opened in 1988